Zois Karampelas (Greek: Ζωής Καράμπελας, born April 27, 2001) is a Greek professional basketball player for Apollon Patras of the Greek Basket League, on loan from AEK Athens. He plays at the point guard position.

Professional career
Karampelas began his pro career in the Greek 2nd Division with Peristeri, in the 2017–18 season. He debuted in Greece's top-tier level, in the 2018–19 season, with Peristeri, in a game against Holargos. He was named the Greek League Best Young Player, of the 2018–19 season. 

On July 17, 2021, Karampelas moved to Larisa, under his former coach Nikos Papanikolopoulos. In 35 league games, he averaged 5.3 points, 2.7 rebounds and 2.9 assists, playing around 20 minutes per contest.

On August 15, 2022, Karampelas signed a three-year contract with AEK Athens and was subsequently loaned to Apollon Patras for the first season.

National team career
Karampelas has been a member of the Greek junior national teams. With Greece's youth national teams, he played at the 2018 FIBA Under-18 European Championship, and at the 2019 FIBA Under-19 World Cup.

References

External links
FIBA Under-19 Profile
Basketball-Reference.com Profile
Eurobasket.com Profile
RealGM.com Profile
Greek Basket League Profile 
Greek Basket League Profile 
Peristeri Profile 

2001 births
AEK B.C. players
Apollon Patras B.C. players
Living people
Greek Basket League players
Greek men's basketball players
Larisa B.C. players
Peristeri B.C. players
Point guards
Basketball players from Athens